Metagyndes innata is a harvestman of the family Gonyleptidae found in Chile.

References

Harvestmen
Animals described in 1929
Fauna of Chile